Om Chol-song (born 12 November 1992) is a North Korean international football player who plays for April 25 Sports Club and North Korea national football team.

References

1992 births
Living people
North Korean footballers
North Korea international footballers
2015 AFC Asian Cup players
Association football forwards